Giancarlo Israel Previato, also known as Giancarlo Previato or simply Gian (born May 14, 1993 in Ribeirão Preto, Brazil), is a Brazilian professional football player, who plays for São Bento.

Career
Previato is an attacking midfielder who began his career in Olé Brasil, a club from his hometown Ribeirão Preto. In 2011, he got transferred to Dordoi Bishkek, of the Kyrgyzstan League, through an 18-month loan deal.  During his time with Dordoi Bishkek, Previato won the local league twice, the Cup once and the Super Cup once as well. He scored in the finals of the two latter tournaments.

On 24 October 2013, Previato signed with Sumy, of the Ukrainian First League.

During the summer of 2014, Previato left Sumy claiming they had not fulfilled their obligations. Following his release, Previato rejected a contract from Olimpik Donetsk, returning to Brazil to train with Botafogo before re-signing with former club Dordoi Bishkek.

Honours

Club
Dordoi Bishkek
Kyrgyzstan League Winner (2): 2011, 2012, 2014
Kyrgyzstan Cup Winner (2): 2012, 2014
Kyrgyzstan Super Cup Winner (1): 2012

References

External links
 

Brazilian footballers
FC Dordoi Bishkek players
PFC Sumy players
Associação Atlética Caldense players
Associação Portuguesa de Desportos players
Esporte Clube Internacional de Lages players
Living people
1993 births
Brazilian expatriate footballers
Expatriate footballers in Moldova
Expatriate footballers in Ukraine
Expatriate footballers in Kyrgyzstan
Association football midfielders
People from Ribeirão Preto
Footballers from São Paulo (state)